Carol Susan Dweck (born October 17, 1946) is an American psychologist. She is the Lewis and Virginia Eaton Professor of Psychology at Stanford University. Dweck is known for her work on motivation and mindset. She was on the faculty at Columbia University, Harvard University, and the University of Illinois before joining the Stanford University faculty in 2004. She is a Fellow of the Association for Psychological Science.

Early life and education
Dweck was born in New York. Her father worked in the export-import business and her mother in advertising. She was the only daughter and the middle sibling of three children.

In her sixth grade class at the P.S. 153 elementary school in Brooklyn, New York, students were seated in order of their IQ. Students with the highest IQ scores could erase the blackboard, carry the flag, or take a note to the principal's office. She said in a 2015 interview, "On the one hand, I didn't believe that a score on a test was that important; on the other hand, every student wants to succeed in the framework that's established. So looking back, I think that glorification of IQ was a pivotal point of my development."

She graduated from Barnard College in 1967 and earned a Ph.D. in psychology from Yale University in 1972.

Career and research
Dweck's first job after graduating was at the University of Illinois (1972–1981). She then joined Harvard's Laboratory of Human Development (1981–1985), returning to Illinois as a full professor (1985–1989). She moved to Columbia University as the William B. Ransford Professor of Psychology in 1989. Since 2004 she has been the Lewis and Virginia Eaton Professor of Psychology at Stanford University.

Mindset work

Dweck has primary research interests in motivation, personality, and development. She teaches courses in motivation, personality, and social development.

Her key contribution to social psychology relates to implicit theories of intelligence, described in her 2006 book Mindset: The New Psychology of Success. According to Dweck, individuals can be placed on a continuum according to their implicit views of where ability comes from. Some believe their success is based on innate ability; these are said to have a "fixed" theory of intelligence (fixed mindset). Others, who believe their success is based on hard work, learning, training and doggedness are said to have a "growth" or an "incremental" theory of intelligence (growth mindset). Individuals may not necessarily be aware of their own mindset, but their mindset can still be discerned based on their behavior. It is especially evident in their reaction to failure. Fixed-mindset individuals dread failure because it is a negative statement on their basic abilities, while growth mindset individuals don't mind or fear failure as much because they realize their performance can be improved and learning comes from failure. These two mindsets play an important role in all aspects of a person's life. Dweck argues that the growth mindset will allow a person to live a less stressful and more successful life. Dweck's definition of fixed and growth mindsets from a 2012 interview:

This is important because 
 individuals with a "growth" theory are more likely to continue working hard despite setbacks and 
 individuals' theories of intelligence may be affected by subtle environmental cues.

As explained by Dweck, a growth mindset is not just about effort. Perhaps the most common misconception is simply equating the growth mindset with effort. "The growth mindset was intended to help close achievement gaps, not hide them. It is about telling the truth about a student's current achievement and then, together, doing something about it, helping him or her become smarter."

Dweck warns of the dangers of praising intelligence as it puts children in a fixed mindset, and they will not want to be challenged because they will not want to look stupid or make a mistake. She notes, "Praising children's intelligence harms motivation and it harms performance." She advises, "If parents want to give their children a gift, the best thing they can do is to teach their children to love challenges, be intrigued by mistakes, enjoy effort, and keep on learning. That way, their children don't have to be slaves of praise. They will have a lifelong way to build and repair their own confidence."

Recent work
Dweck has held the position of Professor of Psychology at Stanford University since 2004, teaching developmental psychology, self theories, and independent studies. In 2017, she stated "I am now developing a broad theory that puts motivation and the formation of mindsets (or beliefs) at the heart of social and personality development." Later that year she published the theory in a paper titled "From needs to goals and representations: Foundations for a unified theory of motivation, personality, and development."

Criticism
Critics have said that Dweck's research can be difficult to replicate. An opinion piece published in The Spectator stated that:

He also stated:

Dweck has responded to this criticism by saying that researchers have not accurately replicated the conditions of the study. Nick Brown, who co-developed the GRIM statistical test argued: "If your effect is so fragile that it can only be reproduced [under strictly controlled conditions], then why do you think it can be reproduced by schoolteachers?" He points out that most of the research in this area has been conducted by Dweck or her collaborators. Another journalist, Tom Chivers writing for BuzzFeed, asserted that:

Despite these criticisms, the findings have been reported in journals such as Psychological Science and Nature, with research teams led by Dweck.

When Brown applied the GRIM test, a simple statistical test used to identify inconsistencies in the analysis of granular data sets, to the work by Mueller and Dweck, he found inconsistencies. Dweck acknowledged and responded to the highlighted inconsistencies, some of which turned out to be mistakes. Brown praised Dweck's "openness and willingness to address the problems" and said she had done a "thorough job of owning up to the problems" of the paper. Brown commented: "I'm still skeptical about mindset as a construct, but at least I feel confident that the main people researching it are dedicated to doing the most careful reporting of their science that they can".

Other education and psychology researchers worry that "mindset" has simply become another aspect to be assessed and graded in children. Matt O'Leary, an education lecturer at Birmingham City University, tweeted that it was "farcical" that his six-year-old daughter was being graded on her attitude towards learning. David James, professor of social sciences at Cardiff University and editor of the British Journal of Sociology of Education, says "it's great to dwell on the fact that intelligence is not fundamentally genetic and unchangeable", but he believes the limitations of mindset outweigh its uses. "It individualises the failure'they couldn't change the way they think, so that's why they failed'." James notes that a study in 2013 showed no statistically significant effect of mindset theory.

In July 2019, a large randomized controlled trial of growth mindset training by the Education Endowment Foundation involving 101 schools and 5018 pupils across England found that pupils in schools receiving the intervention showed no additional progress in literacy or numeracy relative to pupils in the control group, as measured by the national Key Stage 2 tests in reading, grammar, punctuation, and spelling (GPS), and mathematics.

Honors
Dweck was elected to the American Academy of Arts and Sciences in 2002 and to the National Academy of Sciences in 2012. She received the Distinguished Scientific Contribution Award from the American Psychological Association in 2011. On September 19, 2017, the Hong Kong-based Yidan Prize Foundation named Dweck one of two inaugural laureates, to be awarded the Yidan Prize for Education Research, citing her mindset work. The prize includes receipt of approximately US$3.9 million, divided equally between a cash prize and project funding.

Selected publications
 Dweck, C.S., & Bempechat, J. (1983). "Children's theories of intelligence: Implications for learning". In S. Paris, G. Olson, and H. Stevenson (Eds.) Learning and Motivation in Children. Hillsdale, NJ: Erlbaum.

Heckhausen, J., & Dweck, C. S. (Eds.). (1998). Motivation and Self-regulation across the Life Span. Cambridge: Cambridge University Press.
 Dweck, C. S. (2000). Self-theories: Their Role in Motivation, Personality and Development. Philadelphia: Psychology Press.
 Dweck, C. S. (2006). Mindset: The New Psychology of Success. New York: Random House.
 Elliot, A. J., & Dweck, C. S. (Rep. Eds.). (2007). Handbook of Competence and Motivation. New York: Guilford.
 Dweck, C. S. (2012). Mindset: How You Can Fulfill Your Potential. Constable & Robinson Limited.

Personal life
Dweck is married to David Goldman, who is a national theatre director and critic and the founder and director of the National Center for New Plays at Stanford University.

References

External links
Carol Dweck at the Stanford University
Carol Dweck at the Human Intelligence project of the Indiana University
Rae-Dupree, Janet, Unboxed: If You're Open to Growth, You Tend to Grow, The New York Times. July 6, 2008. p. BU3.
Stanford News Service press release: Fixed versus growth intelligence mindsets: It's all in your head, Dweck says
Lisa Trei, "New study yields instructive results on how mindset affects learning", Stanford Report, Feb. 7, 2007
Carol Dweck's TED Talk on the Growth Mindset, TEDxNorrkoping, Nov. 2014
"Mindsets - A Conversation with Carol Dweck", Ideas Roadshow, 2014
"Growth Mindset - Professor Carol Dweck on Bridging the Gaps", 'Bridging the Gaps: A Portal for Curious Minds', 2015

1946 births
Living people
Barnard College alumni
Yale Graduate School of Arts and Sciences alumni
Columbia University faculty
Harvard University faculty
University of Illinois Urbana-Champaign faculty
Stanford University Department of Psychology faculty
Social psychologists
Positive psychologists
Members of the United States National Academy of Sciences
American women psychologists
Fellows of the Association for Psychological Science
American women academics
21st-century American women